Clayton (formerly Clayton's and Claytonville) is a city in Contra Costa County, California, United States. The population was 10,897 as of the 2010 census.

History 
In 1857, the town of Clayton was laid out and founded by Joel Henry Clayton (1812–1872) and his two younger brothers. Clayton was born in Bugsworth, now Buxworth, in the United Kingdom, and emigrated to the United States in 1837. After years in other states he settled down with his wife Margaret (1820–1908) at his town at the foot of Mount Diablo, where he and his family prospered. Clayton was named after Joel Henry Clayton, although only by the flip of a coin. Joel Clayton and Charles Rhine cofounded the town, and each wanted to name it after himself. If Charles had won it would have become Rhinesville, but Joel Clayton won. Joel and his wife Margaret both died in Clayton, and were buried in Live Oak Cemetery in what is now Concord, CA.

Clayton prospered during the coal mining boom in eastern Contra Costa County. The post office opened in 1861. Following a previous incorporation attempt in 1960, Clayton incorporated in 1964  in order to stave off an annexation attempt in 1963 of the Cardinet Glen neighborhood by nearby Concord. After steady expansion during the 1970s to the east and west from its original boundaries, Clayton's land area more than doubled in 1987 to near its present-day boundaries with the annexations of the Dana Hills/Dana Ridge and Clayton Wood subdivisions, as well as the former Keller Ranch property that was developed during the 1990s with the Oakhurst Country Club.

Fires

Wildfires have been a common occurrence in recent years as California had a major drought from 2011-2017.

On September 8, 2013, fire broke out on Mount Diablo. Called the Morgan Fire, it started at the mercury mine area of Morgan Territory Road. The fire grew quickly and threatened homes and livestock. Evacuations were ordered for several areas, including Oak Hill Lane and Curry Canyon. It took over 1000 firefighters and eight aircraft to extinguish it. Full containment was announced on September 14, 2013, having burned .

On July 25, 2018, a vegetation fire broke out on Marsh Creek Rd near Morgan Territory. One home and 3 out buildings were destroyed. Evacuations were ordered for that evening. By July 28 the fire was 100% contained.

On August 16, 2020, Lightning strikes caused many fires across the state, one of which was another Morgan Fire which became part of the LNU Lightning Complex fires.

Geography 

Clayton is located at the foot of Mt. Diablo.

Climate

This region experiences hot and dry summers. According to the Köppen Climate Classification system, Clayton has a warm-summer Mediterranean climate, abbreviated "Csb" on climate maps.

On December 7, 2009, snow fell in Clayton and Concord for the first time since the 1970s.

Education 

It is in the Mount Diablo Unified School District.

The public schools which the K-12 students of Clayton attend include: Mt. Diablo Elementary School, Highlands Elementary School, Diablo View Middle School, Pine Hollow Middle School, and Clayton Valley Charter High School.

Public libraries

The Clayton branch of the Contra Costa County Library system is located in Clayton.

Demographics 

The 2010 United States Census reported that Clayton had a population of 10,897. The racial makeup of Clayton was 9,273 (85.1%) White, 146 (1.3%) African American, 34 (0.3%) Native American, 717 (6.6%) Asian, 16 (0.1%) Pacific Islander, 234 (2.1%) from other races, and 477 (4.4%) from two or more races. Hispanic or Latino of any race were 982 persons (9.0%).

The Census reported that 10,887 people (99.9% of the population) lived in households, 10 (0.1%) lived in non-institutionalized group quarters, and 0 (0%) were institutionalized.

There were 4,006 households, out of which 1,455 (36.3%) had children under the age of 18 living in them, 2,795 (69.8%) were opposite-sex married couples living together, 301 (7.5%) had a female householder with no husband present, 112 (2.8%) had a male householder with no wife present. There were 136 (3.4%) unmarried opposite-sex partnerships, and 36 (0.9%) same-sex married couples or partnerships. 647 households (16.2%) were made up of individuals, and 310 (7.7%) had someone living alone who was 65 years of age or older. The average household size was 2.72. There were 3,208 families (80.1% of all households); the average family size was 3.04.

The population was spread out, with 2,662 people (24.4%) under the age of 18, 602 people (5.5%) aged 18 to 24, 2,185 people (20.1%) aged 25 to 44, 3,846 people (35.3%) aged 45 to 64, and 1,602 people (14.7%) who were 65 years of age or older. The median age was 45.0 years. For every 100 females, there were 93.4 males. For every 100 females age 18 and over, there were 90.3 males.

The homeowner vacancy rate was 0.7%; the rental vacancy rate was 3.8%. 9,936 people (91.2% of the population) lived in owner-occupied housing units and 951 people (8.7%) lived in rental housing units.

Politics

According to the California Secretary of State, as of February 10, 2019, Clayton has 8,078 registered voters. Of those, 3,128 (38.7%) are registered Democrats, 2,685 (33.2%) are registered Republicans, and 1,888 (23.4%) have declined to state a political party.

Media

The city of Clayton is served by the daily newspaper East Bay Times published by Bay Area News Group-East Bay (part of the Media News Group, Denver, Colorado), and by the local newspapers The Clayton Pioneer, and the Diablo Gazette, and is also served by Claycord.com, a conservative local news platform and blog covering community news and events.

Notable people 

 Sean Farnham, sports analyst
 Bob Jones, baseball player
 Brandon Mull, fantasy author
 Paul Napolitano, basketball player
 Sam Williams, football player
 Kara Kohler, Olympic rower
 Charlie Krueger, football player

References

External links

 
 
 Clayton Historical Society website

Cities in Contra Costa County, California
Cities in the San Francisco Bay Area
Incorporated cities and towns in California
Populated places established in 1857
1857 establishments in California